The Citroën Berlingo électrique is a battery-powered version of the first-generation Berlingo range of vans, built and sold between 1998 and 2005. It replaces the C15 électrique.

Overview
As the van was designed from the outset as a petrol, diesel and electric powered vehicle, the instrumentation and controls are very similar to a conventional petrol/diesel van.

After production of the Berlingo électrique was discontinued in 2005, the first-generation Berlingo was fitted with an electric drivetrain developed by Venturi Automobiles that included a ZEBRA molten-salt battery; the resulting Citroën Berlingo First Electric "Powered by Venturi" were delivered to La Poste (France) starting in 2010, but not to general consumers.

It was succeeded in 2013 by the Citroën Berlingo Electric, based on the second-generation Berlingo, which was fitted with an electric drivetrain derived from the Mitsubishi i-MiEV. In 2021, the ë-Berlingo was introduced, based on the third-generation Berlingo and using a drivetrain developed internally by the PSA Group.

Specifications

Dimensions and capacities

Powertrain

The high-voltage storage battery uses 27 nickel-cadmium modules, each operating at 6 V and with a capacity of 100 A-hr, giving the total series-connected assembly a nominal voltage of 162 V and a storage capacity of 16.2 kW-hr.

The Berlingo électrique is equipped with direct drive transmission; the electric motor turns the wheels directly through a reduction gear set.  The vehicle is often mistakenly described as having an "automatic" gearbox whereas in reality the very wide power range of the electric motor when compared with the very narrow power band of an Internal Combustion Engine means that more than one gear is unnecessary.  The Berlingo électrique has in effect only one forward gear which serves from 0-.  The driving mode selector looks similar to an automatic gearbox selector but is limited to Drive, Neutral, Reverse and Park.

Speed and range

Numerous factors affect energy consumption, including terrain, weather, vehicle speed, and controller efficiency. The actual maximum range will depend on the driving style, especially the speed. This is because atmospheric drag is non-linear with speed, i.e., increasing the speed by 25% will decrease the range by 36%. To get the most range for any electric vehicle (and to some extent petrol/diesel vehicles) involves driving at the slowest practical speed. For example, with the Berlingo, energy consumption when driven gently at a slow speed of  can be , but consumption can increase to  if driven faster.

Typical ranges are as follows.

As with any vehicle, driving in rain and snow increases rolling resistance and therefore decreases the miles-per-gallon for petrol/diesel and reduces the miles-per-charge for electric vehicles. Typical reduction in efficiency is about 15%.

Operation

Starting
The ignition key controls the expected functions as a conventionally-powered car; turning the key clockwise through its detents enable accessories at the first stop, then the ignition circuit at the second stop; beyond the second stop, the starting circuit is engaged.

The function of the ignition position (second detent) is slightly different from regular cars as only the STOP and handbrake warning lights (if the handbrake is applied) are displayed. In the conventional Berlingo all the indicator lights are shown at the ignition position to check bulb condition.

When the ignition key is moved to the start position, which is spring-loaded and returns to the second (ignition) detent, the main traction battery relay is energised, causing an audible clunk, and the traction battery is connected to the motor. The STOP warning light is extinguished, and after either the Drive or Reverse position is selected, the accelerator can be used to move the vehicle as normal. If the traction battery plug is connected, the STOP warning light flashes and the vehicle is unable to start. Similarly, if the accelerator is being pressed, or the vehicle is not stationary, the vehicle is unable to start.

When the Drive position is selected, the green forward gear warning lamp in the instrument panel will illuminate. When the Reverse position is selected, the orange reverse gear warning lamp will illuminate.

Instrumentation
The instrument panel features two large round analog gauges, with an analog arc-shaped "Téconoscope"/"Econoscope" between them. The left-hand gauge is a conventional speedometer, while the right-hand gauge provides state of charge information. The Téconoscope provides instantaneous energy flow information; the needle goes to the center ("0") when the vehicle is at rest, moving to the left ("ECO") when energy is being returned to the battery, and to the right (in green, orange, or red zones) to indicate the rate of charge depletion. There is a warning lamp at the far left position of the Téconoscope, which lights when vehicle performance has been limited, either due to low state of charge or when temperature limits have been reached.

The large energy meter display shows remaining energy as a percentage and is surprisingly accurate.  The good accuracy is provided by the onboard controller monitoring the Amp-hours in and out of the battery rather than the battery voltage.  Besides the Téconoscope limited-performance warning light, there is a "traction battery discharged" warning lamp which is designed to illuminate when the state of charge falls below 20%; however, it is operated by the battery voltage.  This can mean that the low energy light does not always illuminate at exactly the same percentage charge across different vehicles or even the same vehicle at different times.

Rectangular warning lights at the bottom of the instrument panel are grouped in three clusters within a single row and include:

Heating

In order to minimise battery usage, a petrol driven heater is fully integrated to vehicle. It typically takes 5 to 10 minutes to warm and provides excellent cabin heating. It takes several minutes for the heater to run down and will therefore continue to operate after the ignition is turned off.

Brakes
When the accelerator is released, regenerative braking returns kinetic energy to the traction battery.

Power assisted brakes are supplied as standard. However, because the vacuum supply from the engine inlet manifold that normally supplies the brake servo is not available on an electric vehicle, a dedicated vacuum pump is used.  Typical operation of the vacuum pump is on for 10–15 seconds and off for a couple of minutes. When the ignition is switched off, braking is not power-assisted.

When the very powerful regenerative braking is active the brake lights are not illuminated. This can be disconcerting for other drivers who may not notice the van slowing significant without the help of the brake lights. The manual states that with a full blown PSA service terminal, brake light operation during regenerative braking can be set to "on" though, while it is set to "off" by default.

Power steering

Power steering is supplied as standard.  However, because the continuous rotation of the engine is not available on an electric vehicle, an electric motor is used to power a power steering hydraulic pump.

Maintenance

Charging
Charging may be performed using a domestic power connector, using a cord stored underneath the passenger's seat. In the UK, the domestic power supply socket should supply 230 V and 16 A, be earthed, and differential current protected (30 mA). With a 230 V/16 A supply, it takes approximately seven to eight hours to replenish the traction battery to 100% when starting from 20% with a domestic connection.

Rapid charging is possible using an Avcon connector to the vehicle inlet on the front wing. The vehicle inlet door acts as a switch, so charging does not start until the switch is closed; there is a small flap to accommodate the connector handle. Rapid charging stops when the traction battery has reached 80% state of charge. If the state of charge is 80% or greater, rapid charging is not possible. With a 150 A supply, the vehicle replenishes approximately 20% state of charge every eight minutes with rapid charging.

The manual does not indicate that removing the charging plug before it is fully charged can illuminate the 'Electrical Fault Light' which stays on until a full trickle charge is performed. This can be quite disconcerting as the manual states the car has to be taken to the dealer to reset the problem. Also, one cannot, or should not, perform a fast charge when it is in this state.

Service items

The Electrique is a simple vehicle with minimal servicing requirements. Under the front bonnet, the auxiliary/accessory battery can be accessed, along with the fusebox and several vehicle fluids (windshield washer, power steering, coolant, and brake). Servicing information is available at Citroën Berlingo Electrique Service Manual

Battery watering must be done at regular intervals (approximately every , depending on usage) and this can be done either at a dealership or by using a kit provided by a third party.

Brush replacement should also be done according to the maintenance schedule, as serious damage will result if it is overlooked.

Common DIY enhancements

The basic Electrique does not come with rear seats or windows. It is common for owners to install a compatible rear seat and rear windows from a conventional Berlingo I Multispace, in countries where this is allowed (not in France).

Availability

Besides in its country of origin, France, the Electrique was made available in at least the following countries.

Sweden
United Kingdom
Denmark
Norway
Belgium
Switzerland

Similar vehicles

The Berlingo électrique is rather similar to the 1992-93 Ford Ecostar, although the Berlingo replaces the older 1991 Citroën C15 électrique.

A Peugeot badged version of this vehicle was marketed as the Peugeot Partner Electric. Battery electric versions of the popular Peugeot 106 and Citroën Saxo super-minis were developed.

During the time when the Citroën Berlingo Electrique was marketed it had no other comparable goods vehicle rival. Since production ended the Nice Car Company has marketed a mini van and Modec has developed an electric commercial vehicle with a 2 tonne payload.

See also
 Alcatel-Lucent
 Wikibooks:Citroën Berlingo Electrique Service Manual
 Wikibooks:Citroën Berlingo Electrique Owners Manual

References

External links

Enthusiast websites
, no longer updated as of August 2016

 , includes a register of Berlingo Electriques and a forum with useful information for all users.
 
 Clean Vehicles with Electric Drive Final report from the Swedish research, development and demonstration programme on electric and hybrid vehicles 1993-2000

Berlingo Electrique
Electric trucks
Electric vans